This article lists described species of the family Asilidae start with letter L.

A
B
C
D
E
F
G
H
I
J
K
L
M
N
O
P
Q
R
S
T
U
V
W
Y
Z

List of Species

Genus Labarus
Labarus ignota (Londt, 2005)

Genus Labromyia
Labromyia albibarbis (Hull, 1962)

Genus Lagynogaster
Lagynogaster affinis (Frey, 1937)
Lagynogaster antennalis (Hsia, 1949)
Lagynogaster bicolor (Shi, 1993)
Lagynogaster boettcheri (Frey, 1937)
Lagynogaster claripennis (Hsia, 1949)
Lagynogaster destillatoria (Hermann, 1917)
Lagynogaster dimidiata (Hsia, 1949)
Lagynogaster fujianensis (Shi, 1995)
Lagynogaster fuliginosa (Hermann, 1917)
Lagynogaster inscriptus (Hermann, 1917)
Lagynogaster princeps (Osten-Sacken, 1882)
Lagynogaster sauteri (Hermann, 1917)
Lagynogaster stigmatica (Hermann, 1917)
Lagynogaster suensoni (Frey, 1937)
Lagynogaster timorensis (Frey, 1937)
Lagynogaster vitalisiana (Frey, 1937)

Genus Laloides
Laloides auripes (Bromley, 1930)
Laloides disciplenus (Walker, 1861)
Laloides justus (Walker, 1858)
Laloides phalaris (Osten-Sacken, 1882)
Laloides productus (Walker, 1857)
Laloides pseudolus (Osten-Sacken, 1882)
Laloides tigris (Tomosovic & Grootaert, 2003)

Genus Lampria
Lampria aurifex (Osten-Sacken, 1887)
Lampria bicincta (Walker, 1860)
Lampria cilipes (Walker, 1857)
Lampria circumdata (Bellardi, 1861)
Lampria clavipes (Fabricius, 1805)
Lampria dives (Wiedemann, 1828)
Lampria fulgida (Schiner, 1868)
Lampria macquarti (Perty, 1833)
Lampria mexicana (Macquart, 1847)
Lampria parvula (Bigot, 1878)
Lampria pusilla (Macquart, 1838)
Lampria scapularis (Bigot, 1878)
Lampria splendens (Macquart, 1834)
Lampria tolmides (Walker, 1849)

Genus Lamyra
Lamyra greatheadi (Oldroyd, 1974)
Lamyra gulo (Loew, 1851)
Lamyra rossi (Oldroyd, 1974)

Genus Laphria
Laphria abdominalis (Walker, 1855) c g
Laphria aberrans Wulp, 1898 c g
Laphria aeatus Walker, 1849 i c g
Laphria aeneiventris Costa, 1857 c g
Laphria affinis Macquart, 1855 i c g b
Laphria aimatis McAtee, 1919 i c g
Laphria aktis Mcatee, 1919 i c g b
Laphria albimaculata Macquart, 1838 c g
Laphria albitibialis Macquart, 1847 c g
Laphria alebas Walker, 1849 c g
Laphria alternans Wiedemann, 1828 c g
Laphria altitudinum Bromley, 1924 i c g b
Laphria amabilis Wulp, 1872 c g
Laphria ampla Walker, 1862 c g
Laphria annulata Gimmerthal, 1834 c g
Laphria annulifemur Enderlein, 1914 c g
Laphria anthrax Meigen, 1804 c g
Laphria aperta Walker, 1858 c g
Laphria apila (Bromley, 1951) i c g b
Laphria appendiculata Macquart, 1846 g
Laphria argentata (Wiedemann, 1828)
Laphria argentifera Walker, 1861 c g
Laphria asackeni Wilcox, 1965 i c g b
Laphria assamensis Joseph & Parui, 1981 c g
Laphria astur Osten-Sacken, 1877 i c g b
Laphria asturina (Bromley, 1951) i c g b
Laphria atomentosa Oldroyd, 1960 c g
Laphria aurea (Fabricius, 1794) c
Laphria aureola Wulp, 1872 c g
Laphria aureopilosa Ricardo, 1900 c g
Laphria auribasis Walker, 1864 c g
Laphria auricincta Wulp, 1872 c g
Laphria auricomata Hermann, 1914 c g
Laphria auricorpus Hobby, 1948 c g
Laphria aurifera Ricardo, 1925 c g
Laphria auriflua Gerstaecker, 1861 c g
Laphria auroria (Wiedemann, 1828)
Laphria azurea Hermann, 1914 c g
Laphria bancrofti Ricardo, 1913 c g
Laphria barbicrura Rondani, 1875 c g
Laphria basalis Hermann, 1914 c g
Laphria basigutta Walker, 1857 c g
Laphria bella Loew, 1858 c g
Laphria bellifontanea Villeneuve, 1928 c g
Laphria benardi Villeneuve, 1911 c g
Laphria bengalensis (Wiedemann, 1828)
Laphria bernsteinii Wulp, 1872 c g
Laphria bifasciata (Olivier, 1789) c g
Laphria bilykovae Paramonov, 1930 c g
Laphria bimaculata (Walker, 1855) c g
Laphria bipartita Macquart, 1855 c g
Laphria bipenicillata Bigot, 1891 c g
Laphria bomboides Macquart, 1849 c g
Laphria breonii Macquart, 1838 c g
Laphria burnsi Paramonov, 1958 c g
Laphria calvescenta Baker, 1975 i c g
Laphria canis Williston, 1883 i c g b
Laphria carbonaria (Snow, 1896) i c g
Laphria carolinensis Schiner, 1867 i c g
Laphria caspica Hermann, 1906 c g
Laphria champlainii (Walton, 1910) i c g b
Laphria chappuisiana (Enderlein, 1914) c g
Laphria chrysocephala Meigen, 1820 c g
Laphria chrysonota Hermann, 1914 c g
Laphria chrysorhiza Hermann, 1914 c g
Laphria chrysotelus (Walker, 1855) c g
Laphria cinerea (Back, 1904) i c g b
Laphria cingulifera Walker, 1856 c g
Laphria claripennis Bigot, 1878 c g
Laphria coarctata Dufour, 1833 c g
Laphria coerulea Boisduval, 1835 c g
Laphria coerulescens Macquart, 1834 c g
Laphria columbica Walker, 1866 i c g b
Laphria comata White, 1918 c g
Laphria complens Walker, 1859 c g
Laphria completa Walker, 1856 c g
Laphria componens Walker, 1860 c g
Laphria comptissima Walker, 1856 c g
Laphria concludens Walker, 1859 c g
Laphria conopoides (Oldroyd, 1972) c g
Laphria consistens Curran, 1928 c g
Laphria constricta (Walker, 1855) c g
Laphria contristans Hobby, 1948 c g
Laphria contusa Wiedmann, 1828 c g
Laphria coquilletti McAtee, 1919 i
Laphria coquillettii Mcatee, 1919 c g b
Laphria ctenoventris Oldroyd, 1970 c g
Laphria cyaneogaster Macquart, 1838 c g
Laphria declarata Walker, 1858 c g
Laphria definita Wulp, 1872 c g
Laphria dentipes Fabricius, 1805 c g
Laphria detecta Walker, 1856 c g
Laphria dichroa Wiedemann, 1828 c g
Laphria dimidiata Macquart, 1846 c g
Laphria dimidiatifemur Oldroyd, 1960 c g
Laphria dira (Walker, 1855) c g
Laphria dispar Coquillett, 1898 c g
Laphria dissimilis Doleschall, 1858 c g
Laphria diversa Wulp, 1881 c g
Laphria divisor (Banks, 1917) i c g b
Laphria divulsa Walker, 1864 c g
Laphria dizonias Loew, 1847 c g
Laphria dorsalis (De Geer, 1776) c g
Laphria doryca (Boisduval, 1835) c g
Laphria egregia Wulp, 1898 c g
Laphria empyrea Gerstaecker, 1861 c g
Laphria engelhardti (Bromley, 1931) i c g b
Laphria ephippium (Fabricius, 1781) c g
Laphria falvifacies Macquart, 1850 c g
Laphria fattigi (Bromley, 1951) i c g
Laphria felis Osten Sacken i c g b
Laphria fernaldi (Back, 1904) i c g b
Laphria ferox Williston, 1883 i c g b
Laphria ferruginosa Wulp, 1872 c g
Laphria flagrantissima Walker, 1858 c g
Laphria flammipennis Walker, 1861 c g
Laphria flava (Linnaeus, 1761) c g
Laphria flavescens Macquart, 1838 i c g
Laphria flavicollis Say, 1824 i c g b
Laphria flavidorsum Matsumura, 1916 c g
Laphria flavifacies (Macquart, 1849)
Laphria flavifemorata Macquart, 1850 c g
Laphria flavipes Wiedemann, 1821 c g
Laphria flavipila Macquart, 1834 i c g
Laphria formosana Matsumura, 1916 c g
Laphria fortipes Walker, 1857 c g
Laphria franciscana Bigot, 1878 i c g b
Laphria frommeri Joseph & Parui, 1981 c g
Laphria fulvicrura Rondani, 1875 c g
Laphria fulvipes Ricardo, 1913 c g
Laphria fulvithorax Fabricius, 1805 c g
Laphria furva Wulp, 1898 c g
Laphria fuscata (Joseph & Parui, 1997)
Laphria futilis Wulp, 1872 c g
Laphria galathei Costa, 1857 c g
Laphria georgina Wiedemann, 1821 i c g
Laphria gibbosa (Linnaeus, 1758) c g
Laphria gigas Macquart, 1838 c g
Laphria gilva (Linnaeus, 1758) i c g b
Laphria gilvoides Wulp, 1898 c g
Laphria glauca Enderlein, 1914 c g
Laphria gravipes Wulp, 1872 c g
Laphria grossa (Fabricius, 1775) i c g b
Laphria gulo  g
Laphria hakiensis Matsumura, 1916 c g
Laphria hecate Gerstaecker, 1861 c g
Laphria hera Bromley, 1935 c g
Laphria hermanni Meijere, 1924 c g
Laphria hirta Ricardo, 1913 c g
Laphria hirticornis Guérin-Méneville, 1835 c g
Laphria histrionica Wulp, 1872 c g
Laphria hobelias (Oldroyd, 1972) c g
Laphria horrida (Walker, 1855) c g
Laphria howeana Paramonov, 1958 c g
Laphria hradskyi Young, 2008 c g
Laphria huron (Bromley, 1929) i c g b
Laphria ignobilis Wulp, 1872 c g
Laphria imbellis Walker, 1857 c g
Laphria inaurea Walker, 1857 c g
Laphria incivilis Walker, 1856 c g
Laphria index Mcatee, 1919 i c g b
Laphria indica Joseph & Parui, 1981 c g
Laphria insignis (Banks, 1917) i c g b
Laphria interrupta Walker, 1856 c g
Laphria iola Bromley, 1935 c g
Laphria ithypyga Mcatee, 1919 i c g b
Laphria ivorina Oldroyd, 1968 c g
Laphria janus Mcatee, 1919 i c g b
Laphria javana Macquart, 1834 c g
Laphria justa Walker, 1858 c g
Laphria karafutonis Matsumura, 1916 c g
Laphria keralaensis Joseph & Parui, 1981 c g
Laphria kistjakovskiji Paramonov, 1929 c g
Laphria lasipes Wiedemann, 1828 i c g
Laphria lata Macquart, 1850 i c g b
Laphria lateralis Fabricius, 1805 c g
Laphria laterepunctata Macquart, 1838 c g
Laphria lepida Walker, 1856 c g
Laphria leptogaster Perty, 1833 c g
Laphria leucocephala Meigen, 1804 c g
Laphria leucoprocta Wiedemann, 1828 c g
Laphria limbinervis Strobl, 1898 c g
Laphria lobifera Hermann, 1914 c g
Laphria luctuosa Macquart, 1847 c g
Laphria lukinsi Paramonov, 1958 c g
Laphria luteipennis (Macquart, 1848) c g
Laphria luteopilosa Joseph & Parui, 1981 c g
Laphria macquarti (Banks, 1917) i c g b
Laphria macra Bigot, 1859 c g
Laphria manifesta Walker, 1858 c g
Laphria marginalis Williston, 1901 c g
Laphria maynei Janssens, 1953 c g
Laphria melania Bigot, 1878 c g
Laphria melanogaster Wiedemann, 1821 i c g
Laphria mellipes Wiedemann, 1828 c g
Laphria meridionalis Mulsant, 1860 c g
Laphria metalli Walker, 1851 c g
Laphria milvina Bromley, 1929 i c g
Laphria mitsukurii Coquillett, 1898 c g
Laphria motodomariensis Matsumura, 1916 c g
Laphria mulleri Wulp, 1872 c g
Laphria multipunctata Oldroyd, 1974 c g
Laphria nathani Joseph & Parui, 1981 c g
Laphria nigella (Bromley, 1934) i c g
Laphria nigrescens Ricardo, 1925 c g
Laphria nigribimba Bromley, 1935 c g
Laphria nigripennis Meigen, 1820 c g
Laphria nigripes Paramonov, 1929 c g
Laphria nigrohirsuta Lichtwardt, 1809 c g
Laphria nitidula (Fabricius, 1794) c g
Laphria notabilis Walker, 1857 c g
Laphria nusoides Bromley, 1931 c g
Laphria ogasawarensis Matsumura, 1916 c g
Laphria ogumae Matsumura, 1911 c g
Laphria okinawensis (Matsumura, 1916)
Laphria orcus Walker, 1857 c g
Laphria orientalis Joseph & Parui, 1981 c g
Laphria ostensa Walker, 1862 c g
Laphria pacifera (Paramonov, 1958)
Laphria pacifica Paramonov, 1958 c g
Laphria partitor (Banks, 1917) i c g b
Laphria peristalsis (Oldroyd, 1972) c g
Laphria pernigra Wulp, 1872 c g
Laphria philippinensis Enderlein, 1914 c g
Laphria pilipes Macquart, 1834 c g
Laphria plana Walker, 1857 c g
Laphria posticata Say, 1824 i c g b
Laphria praelusia Seguy, 1930 c g
Laphria proxima (Walker, 1855) c g
Laphria puer Doleschall, 1858 c g
Laphria pusilla Wiedemann, 1828 c g
Laphria pyrrhothrix Hermann, 1914 c g
Laphria radicalis Walker, 1857 c g
Laphria rapax Osten-Sacken, 1877 i c g
Laphria reginae Paramonov, 1958 c g
Laphria reinwardtii Wiedemann, 1828 c g
Laphria remota Hermann, 1914 c g
Laphria ricardoi Bromley, 1935 c g
Laphria royalensis (Bromley, 1950) i c g
Laphria rubescens Bigot, 1878 c g
Laphria rubidofasciata Wulp, 1872 c g
Laphria rudis Walker, 1856 c g
Laphria rueppelii (Wiedemann, 1828) c g
Laphria rufa Roder, 1887 c g
Laphria ruficauda Williston, 1885 c g
Laphria rufifemorata Macquart, 1846 c g
Laphria rufitibia Oldroyd, 1960 c g
Laphria sackeni (Banks, 1917) c g b
Laphria sacrator Walker, 1849 i c g b
Laphria sadales Walker, 1849 i c g b
Laphria saffrana Fabricius, 1805 i c g b
Laphria sapporensis Matsumura, 1911 c g
Laphria schoutedeni Bromley, 1935 c g
Laphria scorpio Mcatee, 1919 i c g b
Laphria scutellata Macquart, 1835 c g
Laphria semifulva Bigot, 1878 c g
Laphria semitecta (Coquillett, 1910) i c g
Laphria sericea Say, 1823 i c g b
Laphria serpentina Bezzi, 1908 c g
Laphria seticrura Rondani, 1875 c g
Laphria sibirica Lehr, 1989 c g
Laphria sicula Mcatee, 1919 i c g b
Laphria signatipes Wulp, 1872 c g
Laphria sobria Walker, 1857 c g
Laphria solita Wulp, 1872 c g
Laphria soror Wulp, 1872 c g
Laphria stuckenbergi Oldroyd, 1960 c g
Laphria submetallica Macquart, 1838 c g
Laphria taipinensis (Matsumura, 1916)
Laphria taphia Walker, 1849 c g
Laphria taphius Walker, 1849 c
Laphria telecles Walker, 1849 c g
Laphria terminalis Wulp, 1872 c g
Laphria terraenovae Macquart, 1838 i c g
Laphria thoracica Fabricius, 1805 i c g b
Laphria tibialis Meigen, 1820 c g
Laphria transatlantica Schiner, 1868 c g
Laphria triangularis (Walker, 1855) c g
Laphria tricolor Wulp, 1872 c g
Laphria triligata Walker, 1861 c g
Laphria tristis Doleschall, 1857 c g
Laphria trux Mcatee, 1919 i c g b
Laphria unicolor (Williston, 1883) i c g b
Laphria unifascia Walker, 1856 c g
Laphria valparaiensis (Joseph & Parui, 1997)
Laphria varia Loew, 1865 c g
Laphria variana White, 1918 c g
Laphria varipes Bigot, 1878 c g
Laphria venatrix Loew, 1847 c g
Laphria venezuelensis Macquart, 1846 c g
Laphria ventralis Williston, 1885 i c g b
Laphria violacea Macquart, 1846 c g
Laphria virginica (Banks, 1917) i c g b
Laphria vivax Williston, 1883 i c g
Laphria vorax (Bromley, 1929) i c g b
Laphria vulcana Wiedemann, 1828 c
Laphria vulpina Meigen, 1820 c g
Laphria vultur Osten-Sacken, 1877 i c g b
Laphria walkeri Enderlein, 1914 c g
Laphria willistoniana Enderlein, 1914 c g
Laphria winnemana Mcatee, 1919 i c g b
Laphria xanthothrix Hermann, 1914 c g
Laphria yamatonis Matsumura, 1916 c g
Data sources: i = ITIS, c = Catalogue of Life, g = GBIF, b = Bugguide.net

Genus Laphyctis
Laphyctis argenteofasciata (Engel, 1929)
Laphyctis eremia Londt & Dikow, 2018
Laphyctis gigantella (Loew, 1852)
Laphyctis iota Londt & Dikow, 2018
Laphyctis kochi (Lindner, 1973)
Laphyctis orichalcea (Lindner, 1973)

Genus Laphygmolestes
Laphygmolestes flavipes (Hull, 1962)

Genus Laphystia
Laphystia aegyptiaca (Efflatoun, 1937)
Laphystia albiceps (Macquart, 1846)
Laphystia alpheia (Janssens, 1958)
Laphystia anatolica (Hermann, 1920)
Laphystia bromleyi (Wilcox, 1960)
Laphystia brookmani (Wilcox, 1960)
Laphystia canadensis (Curran, 1927)
Laphystia cazieri (Wilcox, 1960)
Laphystia columbina (Schiner, 1868)
Laphystia confusa (Curran, 1927)
Laphystia dimidiata (Oldroyd, 1958)
Laphystia duncani (Wilcox, 1960)
Laphystia flavipes (Coquillett, 1904)
Laphystia francoisi (Janssens, 1966)
Laphystia hispanica (Strobl, 1906)
Laphystia howlandi (Wilcox, 1960)
Laphystia indica (Joseph & Parui, 1997)
Laphystia jamesi (Wilcox, 1960)
Laphystia kuehlhorni (Janssens, 1961)
Laphystia laguna (Wilcox, 1960)
Laphystia lanhami (James, 1941)
Laphystia lehri (Abbassian-Lintzen, 1964)
Laphystia limatula (Coquillett, 1904)
Laphystia litoralis (Curran, 1931)
Laphystia martini (Wilcox, 1960)
Laphystia notata (Bigot, 1878)
Laphystia ochreifrons (Curran, 1931)
Laphystia pilamensis (Hradský, 1983)
Laphystia pursati (Tomasovic & Smets, 2007)
Laphystia robusta (Hermann, 1908)
Laphystia rubra (Hull, 1957)
Laphystia rufiventris (Curran, 1931)
Laphystia rufofasciata (Curran, 1931)
Laphystia sabulicola (Loew, 1847)
Laphystia selenis (Paramonov, 1930)
Laphystia setosa (Theodor, 1980)
Laphystia sillersi (Hull, 1963)
Laphystia snowi (Wilcox, 1960)
Laphystia sonora (Wilcox, 1960)
Laphystia stigmaticalis (Bigot, 1878)
Laphystia texensis (Curran, 1931)
Laphystia tolandi (Wilcox, 1960)
Laphystia torpida (Hull, 1957)
Laphystia utahensis (Wilcox, 1960)
Laphystia varipes (Curran, 1931)

Genus Laphystotes
Laphystotes ariel (Londt, 2004)

Genus Lasiocnemus
Lasiocnemus fascipennis (Engel & Cuthbertson, 1939)
Lasiocnemus hermanni (Janssens, 1952)
Lasiocnemus hyalipennis (Janssens, 1952)
Lasiocnemus londti (Dikow, 2007)
Lasiocnemus lugens (Loew, 1858)
Lasiocnemus obscuripennis (Loew, 1851)

Genus Lasiopogon
Lasiopogon actius (Melander, 1923)
Lasiopogon akaishii (Hradský, 1981)
Lasiopogon albidus (Cole & Wilcox, 1938)
Lasiopogon aldrichii (Melander, 1923)
Lasiopogon apache (Cannings, 2002)
Lasiopogon apenninus (Bezzi, 1921)
Lasiopogon appalachensis (Cannings, 2002)
Lasiopogon arenicola (Osten-Sacken, 1877)
Lasiopogon avetianae (Richter, 1962)
Lasiopogon bellardii (Jaennicke, 1867)
Lasiopogon bezzii (Engel, 1929)
Lasiopogon bivittatus (Loew, 1866)
Lasiopogon californicus (Cole & Wilcox, 1938)
Lasiopogon canus (Cole & Wilcox, 1938)
Lasiopogon chaetosus (Cole & Wilcox, 1938)
Lasiopogon chrysotus (Cannings, 2002)
Lasiopogon coconino (Cannings, 2002)
Lasiopogon curranis (Cole & Wilcox, 1938)
Lasiopogon delicatulus (Melander, 1923)
Lasiopogon dimicki (Cole & Wilcox, 1938)
Lasiopogon eichingeri (Hradský, 1981)
Lasiopogon flammeus (Cannings, 2002)
Lasiopogon fourcatensis (Timon-David, 1950)
Lasiopogon gabrieli (Cole & Wilcox, 1938)
Lasiopogon gracilipes (Bezzi, 1921)
Lasiopogon hasanicus (Lehr, 1984)
Lasiopogon kjachtensis (Lehr, 1984)
Lasiopogon lavignei (Cannings, 2002)
Lasiopogon lehri (Cannings, 2002)
Lasiopogon leleji (Cannings, 2002)
Lasiopogon littoris (Cole, 1924)
Lasiopogon macquarti (Perris, 1852)
Lasiopogon marshalli (Cannings, 2002)
Lasiopogon monticola (Melander, 1923)
Lasiopogon novus (Lehr, 1984)
Lasiopogon oklahomensis (Cole & Wilcox, 1938)
Lasiopogon pacificus (Cole & Wilcox, 1938)
Lasiopogon peusi (Hradský, 1982)
Lasiopogon phaeothysanotus (Cannings, 2002)
Lasiopogon piestolophus (Cannings, 2002)
Lasiopogon pilosellus (Loew, 1847)
Lasiopogon polensis (Lavigne, 1969)
Lasiopogon primus (Adisoemarto, 1967)
Lasiopogon pugeti (Cole & Wilcox, 1938)
Lasiopogon qinghaiensis (Cannings, 2002)
Lasiopogon ripicola (Melander, 1923)
Lasiopogon rokuroi (Hradský, 1981)
Lasiopogon schizopygus (Cannings, 2002)
Lasiopogon septentrionalis (Lehr, 1984)
Lasiopogon shermanni (Cole & Wilcox, 1938)
Lasiopogon slossonae (Cole & Wilcox, 1938)
Lasiopogon soffneri (Hradský & Moucha, 1964)
Lasiopogon solox (Enderlein, 1914)
Lasiopogon tarsalis (Loew, 1847)
Lasiopogon terneicus (Lehr, 1984)
Lasiopogon terricola (Johnson, 1900)
Lasiopogon testaceus (Cole & Wilcox, 1938)
Lasiopogon tetragrammus (Loew, 1874)
Lasiopogon trivittatus (Melander, 1923)
Lasiopogon tuvinus (Richter, 1977)
Lasiopogon woodorum (Cannings, 2002)
Lasiopogon yukonensis (Cole & Wilcox, 1938)
Lasiopogon zaitzevi (Lehr, 1984)
Lasiopogon zonatus (Cole & Wilcox, 1938)

Genus Lastaurina
Lastaurina biezankoi (Carrera & Papavero, 1962)
Lastaurina travassosi (Carrera, 1949)

Genus Lastaurus
Lastaurus alticola (Carrera & Machado-Allison, 1968)
Lastaurus tricolor (Carrera & Machado-Allison, 1968)
Lastaurus fenestratus (Bigot, 1878)
Lastaurus robustus (Carrera, 1949)
Lastaurus transiens (Walker, 1849)
Lastaurus villosus (Carrera, 1949)

Genus Laxenecera
Laxenecera abdominalis (Oldroyd, 1970)
Laxenecera albibarbis (Macquart, 1838)
Laxenecera andrenoides (Macquart, 1846)
Laxenecera auribarba (Karsch, 1879)
Laxenecera auricomata (Hermann, 1919)
Laxenecera auripes (Hermann, 1919)
Laxenecera bengalensis (Wiedemann, 1821)
Laxenecera chapini (Curran, 1927)
Laxenecera chrysonema (Oldroyd, 1970)
Laxenecera cooksoni (Oldroyd, 1974)
Laxenecera dasypoda (Speiser, 1910)
Laxenecera dimidiata (Curran, 1927)
Laxenecera francoisi (Oldroyd, 1970)
Laxenecera gymna (Oldroyd, 1970)
Laxenecera langi (Curran, 1927)
Laxenecera misema (Oldroyd, 1970)
Laxenecera moialeana (Séguy, 1939)
Laxenecera mollis (Loew, 1858)
Laxenecera nigrociliata (Hermann, 1919)
Laxenecera niveibarba (Hermann, 1919)
Laxenecera pulchella (Oldroyd, 1970)
Laxenecera scopifera (Speiser, 1910)
Laxenecera serpentina (Hermann, 1919)
Laxenecera sexfasciata (Walker, 1851)
Laxenecera sororcula (Karsch, 1888)
Laxenecera tristis (Bigot, 1858)

Genus Lecania
Lecania baleta (Walker, 1849)
Lecania boraceae (Carrera, 1958)
Lecania calatina (Walker, 1849)
Lecania clavata (Macquart, 1838)
Lecania ctesicles (Walker, 1851)
Lecania femorata (Macquart, 1838)
Lecania hilarii (Macquart, 1838)
Lecania leucopyga (Wiedemann, 1828)
Lecania mellina (Wiedemann, 1828)
Lecania mygdon (Walker, 1851)
Lecania pollinosa (Hull, 1962)
Lecania rufina (Wiedemann, 1819)
Lecania rufipes (Macquart, 1838)
Lecania sexmaculatus (Walker, 1855)
Lecania tabescens (Rondani, 1875)

Genus Leinendera
Leinendera rubra (Carrera, 1945)

Genus Leptarthrus
Leptarthrus krali (Hradský & Geller-Grimm, 1997)

Genus Leptochelina
Leptochelina jaujensis (Artigas, 1970)

Genus Leptogaster
Leptogaster abdominalis (Hsia, 1949)
Leptogaster aegra (Martin, 1957)
Leptogaster aestiva (White, 1914)
Leptogaster affinis (Lehr, 1972)
Leptogaster aganniphe (Janssens, 1957)
Leptogaster agrionina (Speiser, 1910)
Leptogaster albitarsis (Macquart, 1846)
Leptogaster altacola (Martin, 1957)
Leptogaster angelus (Osten-Sacken, 1881)
Leptogaster angustilineola (Martin, 1964)
Leptogaster annulipes (Walker, 1855)
Leptogaster antennalis (Janssens, 1954)
Leptogaster antenorea (Lioy, 1864)
Leptogaster antipoda (Bigot, 1879)
Leptogaster apicalis (Enderlein, 1914)
Leptogaster appendiculata (Hermann, 1917)
Leptogaster arborcola (Martin, 1957)
Leptogaster arenicola (James, 1937)
Leptogaster arida (Cole, 1919)
Leptogaster aristalis (Janssens, 1957)
Leptogaster armeniaca (Paramonov, 1930)
Leptogaster atridorsalis (Back, 1909)
Leptogaster augusta (Hsia, 1949)
Leptogaster auripulverella (Séguy, 1934)
Leptogaster australis (Ricardo, 1912)
Leptogaster autumnalis (White, 1916)
Leptogaster bahamiensis (Scarbrough, 1996)
Leptogaster bancrofti (Ricardo, 1912)
Leptogaster basalis (Walker, 1855)
Leptogaster basilewskyi (Janssens, 1955)
Leptogaster bengryi (Farr, 1963)
Leptogaster biannulata (Martin, 1964)
Leptogaster bicolor (Macquart, 1848)
Leptogaster bilobata (Hermann, 1917)
Leptogaster bivittata (Lehr, 1975)
Leptogaster brevicornis (Loew, 1872)
Leptogaster brevitarsis (Hardy, 1935)
Leptogaster breviventris (Theodor, 1980)
Leptogaster calceata (Engel, 1925)
Leptogaster californica (Martin, 1957)
Leptogaster calvimacula (Martin, 1964)
Leptogaster candidata (Séguy, 1930)
Leptogaster canuta (Martin, 1964)
Leptogaster cheriani (Bromley, 1938)
Leptogaster cilipes (Frey, 1937)
Leptogaster cingulipes (Walker, 1849)
Leptogaster clavistyla (Rondani, 1848)
Leptogaster coarctata (Hermann, 1917)
Leptogaster collata (Martin, 1964)
Leptogaster coloradensis (James, 1937)
Leptogaster concava (Martin, 1964)
Leptogaster concinnata (Williston, 1901)
Leptogaster coniata (Oldroyd, 1960)
Leptogaster cracens (Martin, 1964)
Leptogaster crassipes (Hsia, 1949)
Leptogaster crassitarsis (Frey, 1937)
Leptogaster cressoni (Bromley, 1942)
Leptogaster crinita (Martin, 1957)
Leptogaster crocea (Williston, 1901)
Leptogaster crockeri (Curran, 1936)
Leptogaster cultaventris (Martin, 1957)
Leptogaster curvivena (Hsia, 1949)
Leptogaster dasyphlebia (Martin, 1964)
Leptogaster decellei (Oldroyd, 1968)
Leptogaster diluta (Martin, 1964)
Leptogaster dissimilis (Ricardo, 1912)
Leptogaster distincta (Schiner, 1867)
Leptogaster dorsopicta (Hsia, 1949)
Leptogaster ealensis (Janssens, 1954)
Leptogaster elbaiensis (Efflatoun, 1937)
Leptogaster elongata (Martin, 1964)
Leptogaster entebbensis (Oldroyd, 1939)
Leptogaster erecta (Meunier, 1906)
Leptogaster eudicrana (Loew, 1874)
Leptogaster evanescens (Janssens, 1954)
Leptogaster exacta (Walker, 1861)
Leptogaster faragi (Efflatoun, 1937)
Leptogaster ferruginea (Walker, 1855)
Leptogaster ferruginea (Walker, 1858)
Leptogaster flaviventris (Hsia, 1949)
Leptogaster flavobrunnea (Hull, 1967)
Leptogaster formosana (Enderlein, 1914)
Leptogaster fornicata (Martin, 1957)
Leptogaster fulvipes (Bigot, 1879)
Leptogaster fumipennis (Loew, 1871)
Leptogaster fumosa (Janssens, 1954)
Leptogaster furculata (Hsia, 1949)
Leptogaster fuscifacies (Martin, 1964)
Leptogaster galbicesta (Martin, 1964)
Leptogaster geniculata (Macquart, 1850)
Leptogaster globopyga (Hull, 1967)
Leptogaster gracilis (Loew, 1847)
Leptogaster habilis (Wulp, 1872)
Leptogaster helvola (Loew, 1871)
Leptogaster hermelina (Janssens, 1954)
Leptogaster hermonensis (Theodor, 1980)
Leptogaster hesperis (Martin, 1957)
Leptogaster hirticollis (Wulp, 1872)
Leptogaster hirtipes (Coquillett, 1904)
Leptogaster hopehensis (Hsia, 1949)
Leptogaster hyacinthina (Scarbrough, 1996)
Leptogaster insularis (Janssens, 1954)
Leptogaster intima (Williston, 1901)
Leptogaster inutilis (Walker, 1857)
Leptogaster jamaicensis (Farr, 1963)
Leptogaster javanensis (Meijere, 1914)
Leptogaster judaica (Janssens, 1969)
Leptogaster kamerlacheri (Schiner, 1867)
Leptogaster kashgarica (Paramonov, 1930)
Leptogaster keiseri (Martin, 1964)
Leptogaster krada (Oldroyd, 1960)
Leptogaster lambertoni (Bromley, 1942)
Leptogaster lanata (Martin, 1957)
Leptogaster laoshanensis (Hsia, 1949)
Leptogaster latestriata (Becker, 1906)
Leptogaster lehri (Hradský & Hüttinger, 1983)
Leptogaster lerneri (Curran, 1953)
Leptogaster levis (Wulp, 1872)
Leptogaster linearis (Becker, 1906)
Leptogaster lineatus (Scarbrough, 1996)
Leptogaster longicauda (Hermann, 1917)
Leptogaster longicrinita (Martin, 1964)
Leptogaster longifurcata (Meijere, 1914)
Leptogaster longipes (Walker, 1858)
Leptogaster longitibialis (Efflatoun, 1937)
Leptogaster ludens (Curran, 1927)
Leptogaster macedo (Janssens, 1959)
Leptogaster macilenta (Wulp, 1872)
Leptogaster maculipennis (Hsia, 1949)
Leptogaster madagascariensis (Frey, 1937)
Leptogaster magnicollis (Walker, 1861)
Leptogaster martini (Farr, 1963)
Leptogaster masaica (Lindner, 1955)
Leptogaster medicesta (Martin, 1964)
Leptogaster megafemur (Hull, 1967)
Leptogaster melanomystax (Janssens, 1954)
Leptogaster micropygialis (Williston, 1901)
Leptogaster moluccana (Doleschall, 1857)
Leptogaster montana (Theodor, 1980)
Leptogaster munda (Walker, 1860)
Leptogaster murina (Loew, 1862)
Leptogaster nartshukae (Lehr, 1961)
Leptogaster nerophana (Oldroyd, 1960)
Leptogaster nigra (Hsia, 1949)
Leptogaster nitens (Bromley, 1947)
Leptogaster nitoris (Martin, 1957)
Leptogaster nubeculosa (Bigot, 1878)
Leptogaster obscuripennis (Johnson, 1895)
Leptogaster occidentalis (White, 1914)
Leptogaster odostata (Oldroyd, 1960)
Leptogaster ophionea (Frey, 1937)
Leptogaster pachypygialis (Engel, 1925)
Leptogaster palawanensis (Oldroyd, 1972)
Leptogaster pallipes (von Roeder, 1840)
Leptogaster palparis (Loew, 1847)
Leptogaster panda (Martin, 1957)
Leptogaster parvoclava (Martin, 1957)
Leptogaster patula (Martin, 1957)
Leptogaster pedania (Walker, 1849)
Leptogaster pellucida (Janssens, 1954)
Leptogaster penicillata (Janssens, 1954)
Leptogaster petiola (Martin, 1964)
Leptogaster pictipennis (Loew, 1858)
Leptogaster pilicnemis (Janssens, 1954)
Leptogaster pilosella (Hermann, 1917)
Leptogaster plebeja (Janssens, 1957)
Leptogaster pubescens (Curran, 1934)
Leptogaster puella (Janssens, 1953)
Leptogaster pumila (Macquart, 1834)
Leptogaster pyragra (Janssens, 1957)
Leptogaster radialis (Janssens, 1954)
Leptogaster recurva (Martin, 1964)
Leptogaster roederi (Williston, 1896)
Leptogaster rufa (Janssens, 1953)
Leptogaster rufescens (Janssens, 1954)
Leptogaster ruficesta (Martin, 1964)
Leptogaster rufirostris (Loew, 1858)
Leptogaster rufithorax (Meijere, 1913)
Leptogaster salina (Lehr, 1972)
Leptogaster salvia (Martin, 1957)
Leptogaster schaefferi (Back, 1909)
Leptogaster schoutedeni (Janssens, 1954)
Leptogaster sericea (Janssens, 1954)
Leptogaster seyrigi (Janssens, 1954)
Leptogaster signata (Meijere, 1914)
Leptogaster similis (Hsia, 1949)
Leptogaster sinensis (Hsia, 1949)
Leptogaster spadix (Hsia, 1949)
Leptogaster spinitarsis (Bromley, 1951)
Leptogaster spinulosa (Meijere, 1914)
Leptogaster stackelbergi (Lehr, 1961)
Leptogaster stichosoma (Janssens, 1957)
Leptogaster straminea (Becker, 1906)
Leptogaster suleymani (Hasbenli & Candan & Alpay, 2006)
Leptogaster tarsalis (Walker, 1861)
Leptogaster tarsalis (Janssens, 1954)
Leptogaster tenerrima (Meijere, 1914)
Leptogaster tenuis (Loew, 1858)
Leptogaster texana (Bromley, 1934)
Leptogaster tillyardi (Hardy, 1935)
Leptogaster titanus (Carrera, 1958)
Leptogaster tomentosa (Oldroyd, 1972)
Leptogaster tomentosa (Theodor, 1980)
Leptogaster tornowii (Brèthes, 1904)
Leptogaster triangulata (Williston, 1901)
Leptogaster tricolor (Walker, 1857)
Leptogaster trifasciata (Meijere, 1914)
Leptogaster trimucronotata (Hermann, 1917)
Leptogaster tropica (Curran, 1934)
Leptogaster truncata (Theodor, 1980)
Leptogaster turkmenica (Paramonov, 1930)
Leptogaster ungula (Martin, 1964)
Leptogaster unicolor (Doleschall, 1858)
Leptogaster unihammata (Hermann, 1917)
Leptogaster upembana (Janssens, 1954)
Leptogaster urundiana (Janssens, 1953)
Leptogaster varipes (Wulp, 1880)
Leptogaster velutina (Janssens, 1954)
Leptogaster vernalis (White, 1914)
Leptogaster virgata (Coquillett, 1904)
Leptogaster vitripennis (Schiner, 1867)
Leptogaster vorax (Curran, 1934)

Genus Leptoharpacticus
Leptoharpacticus mucius (Walker, 1849)

Genus Leptopteromyia
Leptopteromyia americana (Hardy, 1947)
Leptopteromyia argentinae (Martin, 1971)
Leptopteromyia brasilae (Martin, 1971)
Leptopteromyia colombiae (Martin, 1971)
Leptopteromyia lopesi (Martin, 1971)
Leptopteromyia mexicanae (Martin, 1971)
Leptopteromyia peruae (Martin, 1971)

Genus Lestomyia
Lestomyia atripes (Wilcox, 1937)
Lestomyia fraudigera (Williston, 1883)
Lestomyia montis (Cole, 1916)
Lestomyia strigipes (Curran, 1931)
Lestomyia unicolor (Curran, 1942)

Genus Lestophonax
Lestophonax mallophoroides (Hull, 1962)

Genus Lissoteles
Lissoteles acapulcae (Martin, 1961)
Lissoteles aquilonius (Martin, 1961)
Lissoteles austrinus (Martin, 1961)
Lissoteles autumnalis (Martin, 1961)
Lissoteles blantoni (Martin, 1961)
Lissoteles capronae (Martin, 1961)
Lissoteles fernandezii (Kaletta, 1976)
Lissoteles hermanni (Bezzi, 1910)
Lissoteles vanduzeei (Cole, 1923)

Genus Lithoeciscus
Lithoeciscus heydenii (Loew, 1871)

Genus Lobus
Lobus bandipurensis (Joseph & Parui, 1992)
Lobus bicingulatus (Bezzi, 1906)
Lobus evenhuisi (Joseph & Parui, 1991)
Lobus guineae (Martin, 1972)
Lobus jairami (Joseph & Parui, 1984)
Lobus janssensi (Martin, 1972)
Lobus kenyae (Martin, 1972)
Lobus keralae (Martin, 1972)
Lobus liberiae (Martin, 1972)
Lobus martini (Joseph & Parui, 1983)
Lobus pallipes (Janssens, 1953)
Lobus pandai (Joseph & Parui, 1999)
Lobus unilineatus (Martin, 1972)
Lobus vindex (Janssens, 1954)

Genus Lochmorhynchus
Lochmorhynchus albicans (Carrera & Andretta, 1953)
Lochmorhynchus albinigrus (Artigas, 1981)
Lochmorhynchus borrori (Artigas, 1970)
Lochmorhynchus chilechicoensis (Artigas, 1970)
Lochmorhynchus cribratus (Hull, 1962)
Lochmorhynchus leoninus (Artigas, 1970)
Lochmorhynchus longiterebratus (Macquart, 1850)
Lochmorhynchus mucidus (Walker, 1837)
Lochmorhynchus puntarenensis (Artigas, 1970)
Lochmorhynchus senectus (Wulp, 1882)

Genus Lochyrus
Lochyrus balmacedensis (Artigas, 1970)
Lochyrus frezieri (Artigas, 1970)

Genus Loewinella
Loewinella aphaea (Séguy, 1950)
Loewinella arcuata (Curran, 1927)
Loewinella deemingi (Londt, 1982)
Loewinella eburacta (Londt, 1982)
Loewinella flavipes (Londt, 1982)
Loewinella lehri (Londt, 1982)
Loewinella nitidicollis (Lehr, 1958)

Genus Lycoprosopa
Lycoprosopa atrimaculata (Hobby, 1934)

Genus Lycosimyia
Lycosimyia carrerae (Hull, 1958)
Lycosimyia fluviatilis (Carrera, 1960)

Genus Lycostommyia
Lycostommyia albifacies (Hermann, 1907)
Lycostommyia atrifrons (Londt, 1992)
Lycostommyia mopani (Londt, 1992)
Lycostommyia ornithopus (Londt, 1992)
Lycostommyia rhabdotus (Londt, 1992)
Lycostommyia trichotus (Londt, 1992)

References

 
Asilidae